The Girlie Show may refer to:

 Girlie Show (painting), a 1941 painting by Edward Hopper
 The Girlie Show (British TV programme), a British television series
 The Girlie Show, a fictional show in the television series 30 Rock
 The Girlie Show (talk show), an American television series
 The Girlie Show (Madonna), the fourth concert tour by Madonna
 The Girlie Show: Live Down Under, live music video of the concert
 "Girlie Show (Space Ghost Coast to Coast)", an episode of Space Ghost Coast to Coast